Pool F of the Second Round of the 2017 World Baseball Classic was held at Petco Park, San Diego, California, from March 14 to 18, between the top two teams in Pools C and D. Pool F was a round-robin tournament. Each team played the other three teams once, with the top two teams advancing to semifinals. The Dominican Republic, Puerto Rico, Venezuela, and United States advanced to Pool F.

Puerto Rico and the United States advanced to the championship round. The defending champions, the Dominican Republic, were eliminated.

Standings

Pool F MVP:  Yadier Molina

Results
All times are Pacific Daylight Time (UTC−07:00).

Puerto Rico 3, Dominican Republic 1

Puerto Rico made its comeback from its three-loss streak from 2013 World Baseball Classic by giving the reigning champions Dominican Republic its first loss since the 2009 World Baseball Classic.

United States 4, Venezuela 2

Drew Smyly struck out eight Venezuelan batters, while Félix Hernández did not allow a run to the United States for five innings. Adam Jones and Eric Hosmer hit home runs in the eighth inning to give the United States the lead.

Dominican Republic 3, Venezuela 0

Puerto Rico 6, United States 5

With their win against the United States, Venezuela was eliminated from the WBC for the second time since missing out from the first round in the 2013 World Baseball Classic.

Puerto Rico 13, Venezuela 2

United States 6, Dominican Republic 3

Title holders Dominican Republic suffered a shocking elimination to the United States for their final position.

References

External links
Official website

Pool F
World Baseball Classic Pool F
2010s in San Diego
Baseball competitions in San Diego
International baseball competitions hosted by the United States
International sports competitions in California
World Baseball Classic Pool F